Yasim Abdi Mohamed (born November 6, 1981) was one of 17 people arrested on June 2 and June 3, 2006 in the 2006 Toronto terrorism arrests, before all charges against him were dropped two years later.

Life
Born in Mogadishu, Somalia, Mohamed immigrated with his parents to Canada as refugees when he was five years old. They lived in Cambridge, Ontario for twelve years, until Mohamed started becoming a troubled teenager facing difficulties with the law, and his father Mohamed Hagi-Mohamud decided to move the family to Toronto for a "fresh start".

Mohamed was enrolled at Humber College, but dropped out halfway through his first year, and took a job as a baggage handler at Pearson Airport, before finding new work at the Rogers Centre selling ice cream at Toronto Blue Jays games. After a few months however, he found easier work with his friend Ali Dirie, as the pair would travel to New York City and purchase discount (stolen) designer jeans in seedy neighbourhoods, which they would re-sell to merchants in upscale Toronto neighbourhoods for profit, earning up to $1,000 per trip.

During an August 2005 trip however, Dirie and Mohamed talked about whether they should purchase guns for themselves for protection in New York's bad districts. A friend with them insisted he was there for clothing, not weapons, so they dropped him off at a bus stop to travel back to Toronto while they carried on to Ohio in search of a gun. "It wasn't as easy as I thought to buy a gun" Mohamed later said, explaining that they spent two weeks in the United States before they acquired the firearms. However, when they returned to the border to cross back into Canada at the Peace Bridge, border guards found Mohamed carrying a gun in his waistband with ammunition in his sock, while Dirie had two guns taped to his thighs.  Although it was believed to be a typical gun smuggling case, the border guards called the Royal Canadian Mounted Police (RCMP), who grew concerned when they noticed the pair were driving a rental car that had been arranged by Fahim Ahmad, who they were monitoring in an anti-terrorism investigation.

The arrests led the unionised Canada Border Services Agency agents to campaign for the right to carry sidearms themselves, citing Dirie and Mohamed's arrests. Conservative politician John Tory wrote an open letter to Ontario premier Dalton McGuinty suggesting that the arrests indicated more attention must be paid to weapons smuggling at the border.

American Citizens Committee for the Right to Keep and Bear Arms used the arrests of two Canadians importing restricted firearms into Canada as an opportunity to espouse the view that Americans were being unfairly blamed for Canada's gun problems.

Terrorism charges
Dirie and Mohamed both pleaded guilty to charges of possession and importing firearms, and the Crown dropped the charges of possession and importing for the purposes of trafficking. They were sentenced to two years' imprisonment.

Nine months into their sentence, both men were charged with importing firearms for the benefit of a terrorist group and participating in a terrorist group, when Ahmad - who had paid for their rental car - was charged in the 2006 Toronto terrorism case.

As a result of preferred direct indictment by the Crown Attorney on 2007-09-24, Mohamed was re-arrested and only faced 2 charges after the Crown dropped the third charge of providing property to aid and abet a terrorist organization.

Release
Although Mohamed was granted bail in December 2007, Dirie was denied bail in August 2008 by local judge Gisele Marguerite Miller. Under the terms of his bail release, Mohamed was prohibited from leaving Ontario, speaking to anyone with a criminal record including his co-accused, or using the internet. His family welcomed him home, noting that Mohamed had decided to return to school.

While a number of the suspects had their charges dropped in exchange for signing peace bonds stating they would abide by certain conditions, Mohamed refused to sign it stating that he had maintained his innocence and wouldn't be bound by any limitations. He was subsequently the only person to have all his charges dropped without any conditions in April 2008.

Upon his release, he went to work as the general manager of his family's Blue Nile restaurant in the city of Toronto.

References

Living people
1981 births
Somalian emigrants to Canada
People from Mogadishu
People from Cambridge, Ontario
People from Toronto